Archie Williams High School is a public secondary school located in San Anselmo, California. It is named after a former math and computing teacher Archie Williams, who was also a gold medalist in the 1936 Summer Olympics, a flight instructor with the Tuskegee Airmen, and one of the first African-American meteorologists. It was originally named Sir Francis Drake High School, after Francis Drake. It changed its name in 2021, after the George Floyd protests spurred a worldwide reexamination of place names and monuments connected to racism.

The school was established in 1951 as the second high school in the Tamalpais Union High School District. It is located at 1327 Sir Francis Drake Boulevard, situated on a 21-acre (85,000 m2) campus bordered by two creeks. The site was formerly known as Cordone Gardens.

The graduation rate in 2015 was approximately 99%.

History 
Archie Williams High School was founded as Sir Francis Drake High School (aka Drake High School) in 1951 to serve students in grades 9–12 from Corte Madera, Larkspur, Kentfield, Greenbrae, Ross, San Anselmo, Fairfax, Woodacre, Lagunitas, Forest Knolls, San Geronimo, and Nicasio. This was the second high school to be introduced into the Tamalpais Union High School District, the first being Tamalpais High School. In 1958, Redwood High School opened to accommodate students from Corte Madera, Larkspur, Kentfield, Ross, and Greenbrae.

From 1971 until 1984, Drake High School operated a separate "School Within A School" (SWAS) within the pre-1950 Devonshire Hall, for students who wanted to explore alternative community-building, interactive, and experiential pedagogy.  SWAS was a pioneer in developing such an alternative school within a public school system.

Between 1992 and 1995, Drake High School started a new program of small learning communities due to the poor performance of students, which was affecting the perception of the school. Drake has received two state grants for these programs; one in 1996–1997 and the other being in 2000. Since then, there have been four Freshman-Sophomore Academies and two Junior-Senior Academies.

Name change 
During the protests against police brutality and racism that followed the murder of George Floyd, school officials initiated a process to consider changing the name of Sir Francis Drake High School, citing "the racist and violent acts of Francis Drake, a slave trader, slave owner, and colonizer, and the legacy of white supremacy he represents," and noting that "honoring such a person is counter to the values held by our community and counter to the lessons and values we wish our students and colleagues to learn." During the renaming process, the school adopted the temporary name "High School 1327", a reference to its address. On May 6, 2021, an elected school committee composed of students, parents and staff voted unanimously to rename the school after former teacher and Olympic athlete Archie Williams. The Tamalpais United School District Board of Trustees unanimously approved the new name on May 11, 2021.

School awards 
In 1990 the school was designated as a Next Century School by RJR Nabisco Foundation for its "entrepreneurship in education." Drake was one of thirty schools to receive this award.

In 1999 Drake High School was designated as a California Distinguished School.

In 2003 Drake was the first high school to be recognized has a Bay Area Green Business School for its environmental awareness around campus.

Extracurricular activities

Basketball 
In 1982 both the boys and girls basketball teams took the state division II title. The boys basketball team returned to the states championship in 2014 but lost.

Jolly Roger / The Pitch 
The school newspaper, originally named the Jolly Roger, is published almost every month. The 1986-87 edition was a winner of Columbia University’s Silver Crown Award for high school newspapers in 1988.  The Jolly Roger has been a regular recipient of the Medalist rating, given to the top 5% among high school newspapers in its class in United States.

Following the school's name change in 2021, the newspaper also changed its name from Jolly Roger to The Pitch.

Mountain Biking Club 
The school's NICA NorCal League mountain bike team is notable for being one of the first in the nation and has won numerous regional and statewide competitions. The team is eleven-time NorCal League champions (2004, 2006, 2009–2017) and eight-time California State champions (2009-2012, 2015–2018).

Notable alumni

Lance Acord, cinematographer
Lee Altenberg, ('75) theoretical biologist
Arj Barker, comedian
Garm Beall, ('76) film composer
Alex Bennett, radio broadcaster for Sirius XM Left
Joel Blum, Broadway actor and dancer, nominated for two Tony Awards
Terry Bozzio, musician (Frank Zappa, Missing Persons, U.K.)
Scott Capurro, actor, comedian, author
Reggie Carolan, professional football player
Konrad Dryden, author
John Farey, ('73) musician
Linda Gregg, ('61), poet
Erinn Hayes, actress known for Children's Hospital
Steve Lavin, college basketball head coach and ESPN broadcaster
Jane Levy, ('07) actress from ABC comedy Suburgatory and NBC comedy Zoey's Extraordinary Playlist
Edward Neumeier, ('75) screenwriter of RoboCop and Starship Troopers
Carole Real, ('75) playwright
Douglas Rosenberg, ('75) dance performance art and professor at the University of Wisconsin
Michael Rossmann, FSM activist and teacher
Joe Ryan, pitcher for the Minnesota Twins
Fiona O'Sullivan, professional soccer player
Jim Saia, college basketball head coach
Kirk R. Smith, ('63) climatologist, Nobel Prize recipient
Scott Thunes, ('76) musician (Frank Zappa)
Margaret Torn, ('78) carbon geochemist at Lawrence Berkeley Laboratory
Eric L. Weiss, ('76) emergency medicine professor at Stanford University
Alex Zettl, ('74) physicist at Lawrence Berkeley Laboratory

Notable faculty
 Albert L. Lavin and Peter Monahan, English teachers, co-authors of Writing: Unit-lessons in Composition 
 W. Keith MacNab, Chemistry teacher, co-author of Chemistry: Experiments and Principles (1968)
 Archie Williams (May 1, 1915 – June 24, 1993), Math & Computers Teacher and Track Coach, 1936 Berlin Olympics 400-meter gold medalist, Fighter Pilot and Trainer in World War II

References

External links

High schools in Marin County, California
Public high schools in California
San Anselmo, California
1951 establishments in California
Educational institutions established in 1951
Name changes due to the George Floyd protests